Breivikbotn Chapel is a chapel of the Church of Norway in Hasvik Municipality in Troms og Finnmark county, Norway. It is located in the village of Breivikbotn on the west coast of the island of Sørøya. It is an annex chapel for the Hasvik parish which is part of the Alta prosti (deanery) in the Diocese of Nord-Hålogaland. The red, wooden church was built in a long church style in 1959 using plans drawn up by the architect Rolf Harlew Jenssen. The church seats about 90 people.

See also
List of churches in Nord-Hålogaland

References

Hasvik
Churches in Finnmark
Long churches in Norway
Wooden churches in Norway
20th-century Church of Norway church buildings
Churches completed in 1959
1959 establishments in Norway